Dompe Divisional Secretariat is a  Divisional Secretariat  of Gampaha District, of Western Province, Sri Lanka.

History
Dompe Divisional Secretariat is considered one of initial divisional secretariats, established in Sri Lanka. Formerly it was known as Weke Sub Secretarial Office from 1992. In 1996 the name of Weke was changed as Dompe Divisional Secretariat.

References

External links
 Divisional Secretariats Portal

Divisional Secretariats of Gampaha District